In the 1904 Tour de France, the favourites for the victory were Garin, Pothier and Aucouturier, who had all performed well in the 1903 Tour de France. Among the competitors was Henri Paret who, at 50 years old, still holds the record of oldest Tour de France cyclist.

By starting number

By nationality

References

1904 Tour de France
1904